Arunima Sharma (born 23 August 1981) is an Indian actress, who is mostly known for playing Rano Bali in the soap opera on Zee TV, Kasamh Se.  The character Rano is one of the three female leads and the youngest sister of protagonist Bani Walia.

Arunima was born in Duliajan, Assam and moved to Mumbai in 1997 for further studies. She has also been a part of TV show, Kaisa Ye Pyar Hai. While she was in the show, Arunima was known to play the brainy sister. Arunima left Kasamh Se due to back pain.  In addition, she wanted to spend more time with her family.  Arunima was replaced by Pallavi Subhash Chandran. Also, Arunima played Sonu Agarwal in the Star Plus series Kahani Ghar Ghar Ki from 2006 to 2007. She is the younger sister of supermodel & actress Dipannita Sharma.

Television
 Kasamh Se as Rano (The Youngest of three sisters)
 Kahaani Ghar Ghar Kii as Sunaina{sonu}Agarwal

References

Indian television actresses
Indian soap opera actresses
1981 births
Living people
Place of birth missing (living people)
Actors from Mumbai